Out in the Open is a 2019 Spanish-Portuguese thriller film directed by Benito Zambrano which stars Luis Tosar, Luis Callejo and Jaime López. It is an adaptation of the 2013 novel Intemperie by Jesús Carrasco.

Plot 
The Western-like fiction is set in Andalusia in 1946. A kid chased by men on behalf of the local overseer finds a shepherd offering him protection.

Cast

Production 

Adapted by Daniel Remón, Pablo Remón and Benito Zambrano, the screenplay is based on the 2013 novel Intemperie by Jesús Carrasco.

A Spain–Portugal co-production, the film was produced by Morena Films alongside Intemperie La Película AIE, Aralan Films and Ukbar Filmes and it had the participation of RTVE and Movistar+.

Featuring the arid landscapes of the northeast of the province of Granada as a backdrop, shooting lasted from July to August 2018. Shooting locations included the municipalities of Orce, Galera, Castril and Puebla de Don Fadrique.

Release 
Out in the Open had its world premiere at the 64th Valladolid International Film Festival (Seminci) on 19 October 2019, as the official selection's opener. It also screened at the 16th Seville European Film Festival (SEFF) on 9 November 2019. Distributed by A Contracorriente Films, the film was theatrically released in Spain on 22 November 2019.

Accolades 

|-
| align = "center" rowspan = "11"| 2020 || rowspan = "6" | 75th CEC Medals || colspan = "2" | Best Film ||  || rowspan = "6" | 
|-
| Best Director ||  Benito Zambrano || 
|-
| Best Actor || Luis Tosar || 
|-
| Best Supporting Actor || Luis Callejo || 
|-
| Best New Actor || Jaime López || 
|-
| Best Adapted Screenplay || Pablo Remón, Daniel Remón, Benito Zambrano || 
|-
| rowspan = "5" | 34th Goya Awards || colspan = "2" | Best Film ||  || rowspan = "5" |  
|-
| Best Adapted Screenplay || Benito Zambrano, Daniel Remón, Pablo Remón ||  
|-
| Best Original Song || "Intemperie" by Javier Ruibal || 
|-
| Best Supporting Actor || Luis Callejo || 
|-
| Best Production Supervision || Manolo Limón || 
|}

See also 
 List of Spanish films of 2019
 List of Portuguese films of 2019

References

External links 
 Out in the Open at ICAA's Catálogo de Cinespañol

Films set in 1946
Films set in Andalusia
Spanish thriller films
Portuguese thriller films
Films shot in the province of Granada
2010s Spanish-language films
2019 thriller films
Spanish Western (genre) films
Portuguese Western (genre) films
Films based on Spanish novels
Morena Films films
Áralan Films films
2010s Spanish films